Below the Sea is a 1933 American Pre-Code action film directed by Albert S. Rogell and starring Fay Wray,  Ralph Bellamy and Esther Howard.

Plot summary
After a German U-boat is sunk near the end of World War I, its captain, the only living member of the crew 15 years later, plots to retrieve the gold bullion that went down with the boat. He enlists the financial help of a woman who owns a waterfront dive and a world-renowned undersea diver, but when the ship the woman bankrolls sinks the two men sign on to an expedition bankrolled by another woman—this time with scientific knowledge being her motive. They plan to use the expedition's equipment to dive to the wreck and bring up the gold.

Cast
 Ralph Bellamy as Steve McCreary
 Fay Wray as Diana Templeton
 Frederick Vogeding as Von Boulton - Karl Schlemmer
 Esther Howard as Lily
 Paul Page as Jackson 
 A. Trevor Addinsell as Waldridge 
 William J. Kelly as Dr. Chapman

References

External links
 
 
 
 

1933 films
Columbia Pictures films
1933 adventure films
1930s romance films
American adventure films
American romance films
Seafaring films
Treasure hunt films
Underwater action films
Films directed by Albert S. Rogell
Films with screenplays by Jo Swerling
1930s English-language films
1930s American films